Moustapha Enock Djidjiwa (born 7 November 1995) is a Cameroonian professional footballer who plays as a forward for Albanian club KF Erzeni.

Club career
In June 2017, Djidjiwa joined Albanian Superliga club Partizani Tirana and was given squad number 25. Then he was included in Sulejman Starova's squad for the 2017–18 UEFA Europa League first qualifying round tie versus Botev Plovdiv. He made his debut in the competition on 29 June by entering in the final 16 minutes of a 3–1 home loss at home.

Djidjiwa begun the domestic season on 10 September by making his league debut against Laçi, entering in the final minutes in place of Sodiq Atanda as the team lost 2–0. He scored his first two goals for the team three days later in the first leg of 2017–18 Albanian Cup first round against Naftëtari Kuçovë. Partizani won the match 6–2.

Djidjiwa was released by Partizani in the first days of 2018 after collecting only 5 league appearances with no goals.

Shortly after, Djidjiwa joined Albanian First Division side Erzeni Shijak by penning a contract until the end of 2017–18 season. He debuted on 28 January by playing full-90 minutes in the 2–0 home win over Besa Kavajë. He opened his scoring account in his second appearance for the club on 17 February in the league encounter versus Burreli, netting the opener in an eventual 1–1 away draw.

Later on throughout the season, Djidjiwa become a vital instrumental for Erzeni, netting 8 goals in 14 league appearances as the team finished third in Group B of Promotion round. On 25 April, he signed a contract extension for another year.

On 10 August, Djidjiwa completed a transfer to fellow First Division side Burreli; the club reportedly offered him a very lucrative contract compare to Erzeni. During his time at the club, Djidjiwa made 9 appearances and scored three goals, including a brace against Vora.

On 22 January 2019, Djidjiwa joined Bylis Ballsh on a deal until the end of 2018–19 campaign.

Career statistics

References

External links
Moustapha Djidjiwa at the Albanian Football Association

1995 births
Living people
People from Bertoua
Cameroonian footballers
Association football forwards
Cameroon international footballers
Cameroonian expatriate footballers
Cameroonian expatriate sportspeople in Albania
FK Partizani Tirana players
KF Erzeni players
KS Burreli players
KF Bylis Ballsh players
Kategoria Superiore players
Kategoria e Parë players
Expatriate footballers in Albania
Eding Sport FC players